The following is a list of notable deaths in September 2013.

Entries for each day are listed alphabetically by surname. A typical entry lists information in the following sequence:
Name, age, country of citizenship and reason for notability, established cause of death, reference.

September 2013

1
 Manuel Andrés, 83, Spanish writer and actor, respiratory failure.
 Zvonko Bušić, 67, Croatian airplane hijacker (TWA Flight 355), suicide by gunshot.
 Joaquim Justino Carreira, 63, Portuguese-born Brazilian Roman Catholic prelate, Bishop of Guarulhos (since 2011).
 Pál Csernai, 80, Hungarian footballer and manager (FC Bayern Munich, North Korea).
 Ignacio Eizaguirre, 92, Spanish footballer (Valencia, Real Sociedad, national team).
 Ole Ernst, 73, Danish actor.
Philip I. Marcus, 86, American virologist.
 Tommy Morrison, 44, American heavyweight champion boxer (WBO) and actor (Rocky V), multiple organ failure.
Chris Packer, 60, Australian sailor.
Christoph Schumann, 44, German political scientist.
Gordon Steege, 95, Australian military officer, RAAF flying ace.
Margaret Mary Vojtko, 83, American linguist.
 Ken Wallis, 97, British autogyro exponent and James Bond stunt pilot.

2
Levon Ananyan, 66, Armenian journalist and translator.
 Valérie Benguigui, 52, French César Award-winning actress, breast cancer.
Terry Clawson, 73, English rugby league player.
Ronald Coase, 102, British economist, laureate of the Nobel Prize in Economics (1991).
Paul Danilo, 94, American soccer player and coach.
Arthur J. Deikman, 83, American psychiatrist, Parkinson's disease.
Ricardo Elmont, 58, Surinamese judoka.
David Jacobs, 87, British radio and television broadcaster (Juke Box Jury, Any Questions?).
Pablo Krögh, 50, Chilean actor (Dawson Isla 10), tongue cancer.
Olga Lowe, 93, British stage and film actress.
Makoto Moroi, 82, Japanese composer.
Noel Olsen, 67, British doctor, prostate cancer.
Frederik Pohl, 93, American science fiction author (Man Plus, Gateway).
Henry Putzel Jr., 99,  American lawyer and Reporter of Decisions of the United States Supreme Court.
Shahid Qureshi, 77, Pakistani cricketer.
Isidro Sánchez García-Figueras, 76, Spanish footballer.
Sir Paul Scoon, 78, Grenadian politician, Governor-General (1978–1992).
Boris Sergeyevich Sokolov, 99, Russian geologist and paleontologist.
Alain Testart, 67, French social anthropologist.
Hugh van Cutsem, 72, British horse breeder.
Dame Juliet Wheldon, 63, British civil servant.

3
Anna Beneck, 71, Italian butterfly swimmer.
Ariel Castro, 53, American convicted kidnapper and rapist, suicide by hanging.
Alvin Eisenman, 92, American graphic designer and academic.
Donald Featherstone, 95, British wargamer, complications from a fall.
Pedro Ferriz Santacruz, 92, Mexican journalist.
Albert Heffer, 79, South African cricketer.
Ralph M. Holman, 99, American judge, Associate Justice of the Oregon Supreme Court (1965–1980).
José Ramón Larraz, 84, Spanish movie director (Vampyres) and comics writer.
Janet Lembke, 80, American writer.
Rick McCann, 69, Canadian ice hockey player (Detroit Red Wings).
Don Meineke, 82, American basketball player (Fort Wayne Pistons).
Lewis Morley, 88, British Hong Kong-born Australian photographer (Christine Keeler, Joe Orton).
Dick Ukeiwé, 84, New Caledonian politician, member of the French Senate (1983–1992) and the European Parliament (1989–1994).

4
Ferdinand Biwersi, 79, German football referee.
Raphael Dinyando, 53, Namibian politician and diplomat, Ambassador to Austria (since 2010), MP for Rundu (2000–2010), Mayor of Rundu (1993–1998), cancer.
Sir Arthur George, 98, Australian lawyer and soccer administrator.
Sankie Maimo, 82-83, Cameroonian dramatist and playwright.
Michel Pagé, 63, Canadian politician.
Jules Paivio, 97, Canadian cartographer and teacher, last surviving Canadian veteran of the Spanish Civil War.
Dick Raaijmakers, 83, Dutch composer, theater maker and theorist.
Lennart Risberg, 78, Swedish Olympic light-heavyweight boxer (1956).
Daniele Seccarecci, 33, Italian bodybuilder, heaviest male competitor, myocardial infarction.
Stanislav Stepashkin, 73, Soviet Olympic boxing champion (1964).
Shinya Taniguchi, 32, Japanese Olympic swimmer (2000), stomach cancer.
Casey Viator, 62, American bodybuilder, AAU Mr. America (1971), heart attack.
Joe Warham, 93, English rugby league coach (Leeds).

5
Sushmita Banerjee, 49, Indian writer, shot. (body discovered on this date)
Edwin Bideau, 62, American politician, member of the Kansas House of Representatives (1985–1988, since 2012).
Mel Cooke, 79, New Zealand rugby league player (Canterbury).
Robert Farrar Capon, 87, American Episcopal priest and author.
Willie Frazier, 71, American football player (Houston Oilers, San Diego Chargers).
Geoffrey Goodman, 91, British journalist and trade unionist.
Lakhumal Hiranand Hiranandani, 96, Indian otorhinolaryngologist, social activist and philanthropist.
Isamu Jordan, 37, American journalist, musician and academic, suicide.
Maurice Lerner, 77, American Mafia hit man.
Lloyd Mayer, 63, American gastroenterologist and immunologist, brain cancer.
Rochus Misch, 96, German SS non-commissioned officer, last survivor of the Führerbunker.
Gene Nottolini, 69, American judge, leukemia.
Marijan Novović, 66, Serbian basketball coach and player.
Mireya Véliz, 98, Chilean actress.
Sangeen Zadran, 45, Pakistani militant, shadow governor of Paktika Province, drone strike.

6
Ann C. Crispin, 63, American science fiction author (The Han Solo Trilogy, Sarek), bladder cancer.
Dick Hess, 74, American politician, member of the Pennsylvania House of Representatives (since 1987), complications from surgery.
Barbara Hicks, 89, English actress (Brazil, Howards End).
Bobby Martin, 83, American music producer, arranger and songwriter.
*Khin Maung Kyi, 86, Burmese economist.
Santiago Rosario, 74, Puerto Rican baseball player (Kansas City Athletics).
Sir Cameron Rusby, 87, British vice admiral.
Adin Talbar, 91, German-born Israeli diplomat.
Bill Wallis, 76, British actor (Brazil, The Other Boleyn Girl, War and Remembrance).
Frederick Zugibe, 85, American medical examiner and Shroud of Turin investigator.

7
Jean Anyon, 72, American educationalist.
Albert Allen Bartlett, 90, American physicist.
Romesh Bhandari, 85, Indian politician, Foreign Secretary (1985–1986), Governor of Uttar Pradesh (1996–1998).
Frank Blevins, 74, Australian politician, Deputy Premier of South Australia (1992–1993), cancer.
Alexander Cools, 71, Dutch behavioral pharmacologist.
Wolfgang Frank, 62, German football player and coach, cancer.
Susan Fuentes, 58, Filipino singer, complications from kidney ailment.
Joseph Granville, 90, American financial writer, pneumonia.
Barney Hayhoe, Baron Hayhoe, 88, British politician, MP for Heston and Isleworth (1970–1974) and Brentford and Isleworth (1974–1992).
Pete Hoffman, 94, American cartoonist.
Ilja Hurník, 90, Czech composer and essayist.
Fred Katz, 94, American jazz cellist and composer.
Kuluypa Konduchalova, 93, Soviet-born Kyrgyz teacher and politician, Minister of Culture (1958–1980).
Ted Loden, 73, British army colonel, shot.
Mehdi Mohammadi, 60, Iranian football player and coach, heart attack.
Vitthalbhai Patel, 78, Indian songwriter and politician.
Barry Smith, 58, Canadian ice hockey player (Boston Bruins).
Marek Špilár, 38, Slovak footballer, suicide by self-defenestration.
Dokka Umarov, 49, Chechen Islamic extremist militant, poisoned.

8
Fernando Compte, 82, Spanish wrestler.
Louise Currie, 100, American film actress (Adventures of Captain Marvel, Citizen Kane).
Loo-Chi Hu, 88, Chinese-born New Zealand marine equipment designer, fisheries consultant and t'ai chi teacher.
Léopold Jorédié, 66, New Caledonian politician, Vice President (1999–2001).
Ahmed Kebaili, 88, Algerian cyclist.
José Guadalupe Padilla Lozano, 92, Mexican Roman Catholic prelate, Bishop of Veracruz (1963–2000).
Don Reichert, 81, Canadian artist.
Harris Rowe, 89, American politician, businessman, and lawyer.
Tore Sinding-Larsen, 83, Norwegian judge.
Lacey Baldwin Smith, 90, American historian.
Jean Véronis, 58, French linguist and blogger.
Carl von Gerber, 82, Swedish Olympic sprint canoer (1960, 1964).
Cal Worthington, 92, American car dealer, natural causes.

9
Sunila Abeysekera, 61, Sri Lankan human rights campaigner. 
Alberto Bevilacqua, 79, Italian writer and film director, cardiac arrest.
Patricia Blair, 80, American actress (The Rifleman, Daniel Boone), breast cancer.
Champignon, 35, Brazilian musician (Charlie Brown Jr., Revolucionnários, A Banca), suicide by gunshot.
Susan Fitzgerald, 64, Irish actress (Angela's Ashes), colorectal cancer.
Forrest, 60, American singer, stroke.
Saburo Kamei, 75, Japanese voice actor (Fist of the North Star).
Saul Landau, 77, American filmmaker, bladder cancer.
Mamafaka, 34, Thai graphic designer and street artist, surfing incident.
Dorothy Swain Lewis, 97, American aviator.
Bill Ray, 91, American politician, member of the Alaska House of Representatives (1965–1971) and Senate (1971–1987).
Rebecca Sedwick, 12, American cyberbullying victim, suicide by jumping.
Gunnar Høst Sjøwall, 77, Norwegian photographer.
Shalom Yoran, 88, Polish Jewish partisan and author (The Defiant).

10
Damian Gardiner, 44, Irish Olympic equestrian, esophageal cancer.
Richard Grey, 6th Earl Grey, 74, British peer and businessman.
György Gurics, 84, Hungarian Olympic wrestler, bronze medalist (1952).
John Hambrick, 73, American television news anchor (WNBC, WEWS), actor and announcer, lung cancer.
Barry Hancock, 74, English footballer (Port Vale).
Ibrahim Makhous, 88, Syrian politician.
Constantin Moldoveanu, 69, Romanian soccer player.
Anne-Sylvie Mouzon, 57, Belgian politician, member of the Brussels Regional Parliament (since 1989), cancer.
Don Nelson, 86, American screenwriter (The Adventures of Ozzie and Harriet), Parkinson's disease.
Josef Němec, 79, Czech Olympic boxer, bronze medalist (1960).
Lyn Peters, 72, Argentine-born British model and actress (Get Smart, Hogan's Heroes).
Glen Pommerening, 85, American politician and lawyer.
Peter Paul Prabhu, 82, Indian Roman Catholic prelate, Archbishop of Tituli in Numidia (since 1993).
Ivan Sag, 63, American linguist, cancer.
Clay Shaw, 74, American politician, member of U.S. House of Representatives from Florida (1981–2007), Mayor of Fort Lauderdale (1975–1981), lung cancer.
Kjell Sjöberg, 76, Swedish Olympic ski jumper. 
Glen Skov, 82, Canadian ice hockey player (Detroit Red Wings).
Corey Swinson, 43, American football player (St. Louis Rams).
Jack Vance, 80, Canadian army lieutenant general.

11
Marshall Berman, 72, American philosopher and writer.
Fernand Boone, 79, Belgian footballer.
Francisco Chavez, 66, Filipino human rights lawyer, Solicitor General (1987–1992), stroke. 
Ramachandra Deva, 67, Indian poet, playwright and critic.
Keith Dunstan, 88, Australian newspaper columnist and writer, cancer.
 Jimmy Fontana, 78, Italian singer-songwriter, composer ("Che sarà") and actor.
Edith Guillaume, 69–70, Danish mezzo-soprano.
Albert Jacquard, 87, French geneticist and essayist.
Albert Jones, 93, New Zealand amateur astronomer.
Pierre Léon, 87, French-Canadian linguist and writer, cancer.
Flora Arca Mata, 95, American teacher.
Demetrius Newton, 85, American politician and civil rights attorney. 
Fritz Nussbaum, 89, Swiss Olympic athlete.
Mats Olsson, 83, Swedish musician.
*Prince Jazzbo, 62, Jamaican reggae DJ, lung cancer.
Virgil A. Richard, 76, American army brigadier general.
William Sullivan, 91, American politician and lawyer, member of the Kentucky Senate (1954–1958, 1966–1982).
Andrzej Trybulec, 72, Polish mathematician and computer scientist.
Tom Vernon, 74, British writer and broadcaster (Fat Man series), heart attack.

12
Abu Mansoor Al-Amriki, 29, American Islamist, shot. (death announced on this date)
Ray Dolby, 80, American audio engineer and inventor (Dolby NR, surround sound), leukemia.
Warren Giese, 89, American college football coach and politician, member of the South Carolina Senate (1985–2004).
William Graham, 87, American director (The X-Files, Batman, The Fugitive), pneumonia. 
Sheldon Hackney, 79, American educationalist. 
Erich Loest, 87, German author and screenwriter (Nikolaikirche), suicide by self-defenestration.
Rod Masterson, 68, American actor (Blaze), Parkinson's disease.
Candace Pert, 67, American neuroscientist, cardiovascular arrest.
Vinod Raina, Indian educationist, cancer.
Joan Regan, 85, British traditional pop singer.
Otto Sander, 72, German actor (Wings of Desire, Das Boot).
Robert Steiner, 95, British radiologist.
Avrum Stroll, 92, American philosopher and author.
Frank Tripucka, 85, American football player (Denver Broncos, Detroit Lions), heart failure.

13
Olusegun Agagu, 65, Nigerian politician, Governor of Ondo State (2003–2009).
Rafiquddin Ahmad, 81, Bangladeshi businessman and educationalist.
Peter Aston, 74, English composer.
Robert J. Behnke, 83, American fisheries biologist.
James Bradford, 84, American Olympic weightlifter (1952, 1960).
Rick Casares, 82, American football player (Chicago Bears).
Ronnie Clark, 81, Scottish footballer.
Nora Daza, 84, Filipina chef.
Carlos Eiras, 81, Argentine Olympic skier.
Wayne Green, 91, American magazine publisher. 
Jimmy Herman, 72, Canadian actor (Dances with Wolves, North of 60, Unforgiven).
Anwar Hossain, 82, Bangladeshi actor.
Methodius, 72, Ukrainian Orthodox bishop.
Dan Osinski, 79, American baseball player (Los Angeles Angels, Boston Red Sox).
Antoneta Papapavli, 75, Albanian stage actress.
Patti Webster, 49, American publicist (Usher, Janet Jackson), brain cancer.

14
Maksym Bilyi, 24, Ukrainian footballer, brain tumor.
Sir John Curtiss, 88, British Royal Air Force officer.
Osama El-Baz, 83, Egyptian diplomat.
Faith Leech, 72, Australian Olympic champion freestyle swimmer (1956).
Roy Mackal, 88, American biologist, cryptozoologist, and author, heart failure.
Athar Mahmood, 61, Pakistani diplomat.
Peter Morley, 84, British businessman and football club chairman (Crystal Palace).
Jorge Pedreros, 71, Chilean musician and comedian, pneumonia.
Apoorva Sengupta, 75, Indian cricketer.
Amund Venger, 69, Norwegian politician.

15
Munzir Al-Musawa, 40, Indonesian Islamic scholar, complications of asthma and encephalitis.
Jerry G. Bishop, 77, American disc jockey and television personality, creator of Svengoolie, heart attack.
Gerard Cafesjian, 88, American businessman and philanthropist.
Margaret Cooper, 91, English nurse and nurse-tutor.
Henry Rudolph Immerwahr, 97, German classical scholar.
Elizabeth Wright Ingraham, 91, American architect and educator, congestive heart failure.
Joyce Jacobs, 91, British-born Australian actress (A Country Practice). 
Jackie Lomax, 69, English guitarist and singer-songwriter.
William Clyde Martin Jr., 83, American physicist.
Assan Musa Camara, 91, Gambian politician, Foreign Minister (1967–1974), Vice President (1972–1982), President (1981).
Tomás Ó Canainn, 82, Irish uilleann piper.
Émile Turlant, 109, French centenarian, France's oldest living man.
Paolo Zantelli, 48, Italian F2 racing boat pilot, boat race collision.

16
Scott Adams, 46, American football player (Minnesota Vikings, New Orleans Saints), heart attack.
Philip Berg, 86, American rabbi, Leader of the Kabbalah Centre (since 1969).
Jack Britto, 87, Pakistani Olympic hockey player (1952). 
Mac Curtis, 74, American rockabilly singer, injuries received in a traffic collision.
David Cheung, 77, Hong Kong educator and pastor, member of the Legislative Council of Hong Kong (1988–1991).
Daniel Díaz Torres, 64, Cuban film director, cancer.
Ratiba El-Hefny, 82, Egyptian opera singer and director (Cairo Opera House).
Stanley Elkins, 88, American historian.
Susan Farmer, 71, American politician, Secretary of State of Rhode Island (1982–1986), cancer.  
Eduardo García de Enterría, 90, Spanish jurist, awarded Prince of Asturias Award for Social Sciences (1984). 
Terrie Hall, 53, American CDC spokesperson and anti-tobacco advocate, cancer.
Kim Hamilton, 81, American actress (To Kill a Mockingbird, Days of Our Lives, Star Trek: The Next Generation).
Joan Hanke-Woods, 67, American Hugo Award-winning artist.
George Hockham, 74, British electrical engineer.
Tammareddy Krishna Murthy, 93, Indian film producer.
Jim Palmer, 80, American basketball player (New York Knicks).
Juan Luis Panero, 71, Spanish poet.
Chin Peng, 89, Malaysian politician, leader of the Malayan Communist Party.
Jimmy Ponder, 67, American jazz guitarist, lung cancer.
Howard Sheppard, 79, Canadian politician, member of the Legislative Assembly of Ontario (1981–1987).
Fred Sherman, 81, American biologist. 
David Avraham Spector, 58, Dutch-born Israeli rabbi, cancer.
Patsy Swayze, 86, American dancer and choreographer (Urban Cowboy, Hope Floats, Big Top Pee-wee), complications from a stroke.
Arend van der Wel, 80, Dutch football player.

17
Otha Bailey, 83, American Negro league baseball player.
Ted Connelly, 94, Australian politician, Speaker of the South Australian House of Assembly (1975–1977).
Martí de Riquer i Morera, 99, Spanish Catalan linguist and nobleman, 8th Count of Casa Dávalos, veteran of the Spanish Civil War.
Michael Giannatos, 72, Greek actor (Midnight Express, Munich, Captain Corelli's Mandolin), heart attack.
Kristian Gidlund, 29, Swedish musician (Sugarplum Fairy) and journalist, stomach cancer.
Larry Lake, 70, American-born Canadian broadcaster and musician.
Peter K. Leisure, 84, American senior judge of the District Court for the Southern District of New York.
Pierre Macq, 83, Belgian physicist, Rector of Universite Catholique de Louvain (1986–1995).
Jack Mangan, 86,  Irish Gaelic footballer.
Bernie McGann, 76, Australian jazz alto saxophonist, complications from heart surgery.
Alex Naumik, 64, Lithuanian-born Norwegian artist, songwriter and record producer.
Michael J. Noonan, 78, Irish politician, TD for Limerick West (1969–1977); Minister for Defence (1987–1989).
Dick O'Neal, 78, American basketball player (Texas Christian University).
Marvin Rainwater, 88, American country and rockabilly singer ("Whole Lotta Woman"), heart failure.
Eiji Toyoda, 100, Japanese industrialist (Toyota Motor Company), heart failure.
Allan Walsh, 73, Australian politician, member of the New South Wales Legislative Assembly for Maitland (1981–1991).
Rein Welschen, 72, Dutch politician, Mayor of Eindhoven (1992–2003).

18
Torleiv Anda, 92, Norwegian diplomat and politician.
Veliyam Bharghavan, 85, Indian politician.
Lindsay Cooper, 62, British rock and jazz bassoonist and oboist (Henry Cow, Comus, Feminist Improvising Group), multiple sclerosis.
Rafael Corkidi, 83, Mexican cinematographer.
Joy Covey, 50, American business executive (Amazon.com), bicycle collision.
Johannes van Dam, 66, Dutch food journalist.
Stanislas Dombeck, 81, French footballer (Tours, Stade Français, Rennes, Amiens) and coach (Tours).
Allan Ellis, 62, American football player (Chicago Bears, San Diego Chargers), heart attack.
Pavlos Fyssas, 34, Greek anti-fascist rapper, stabbed.
Dame Monica Gallagher, 90, Australian community worker and church activist.
Marta Heflin, 68, American actress (Come Back to the Five and Dime, Jimmy Dean, Jimmy Dean, A Perfect Couple). 
Johnny Laboriel, 71, Mexican rock 'n' roll singer, prostate cancer.
Arthur Lamothe, 84, French-born Canadian film director and producer.
Dominique Loiseau, 64, French watchmaker. 
Donald Low, 68, Canadian microbiologist, key figure in Toronto SARS outbreak, brain cancer.
Stephen Malawista, 79, American medical researcher, discovered Lyme disease.
Ken Norton, 70, American former WBC heavyweight champion boxer and actor (Mandingo, Drum), heart failure.
 Lisa Otto, 93, German operatic soprano.
Carlos Alberto Raffo, 87, Argentine-born Ecuadorian footballer (Emelec).
Marcel Reich-Ranicki, 93, German literary critic.
Luigi Rapini, 89, Italian Olympic basketball player.
Richard C. Sarafian, 83, American film and television director (I Spy, Vanishing Point, 77 Sunset Strip), complications from pneumonia.

19
Amidou, 78, Moroccan actor (Ronin, Spy Game, Rules of Engagement).
Robert Barnard, 76, English crime writer and critic.
Sven Josef Cyvin, 82, Norwegian chemist.
Øystein Fischer, 71, Norwegian physicist.
Brian Furniss, 78, English cricketer (Derbyshire).
Mary Jean Harrold, 66, American computer scientist, cancer.
Patrick Kay, 92, British Royal Marines major general.
Gerrie Mühren, 67,  Dutch footballer (Ajax, national team), European Cup winner (1971, 1972, 1973), complications from myelodysplastic syndrome.
John Reger, 82, American football player (Pittsburgh Steelers, Washington Redskins).
Viktor Tišler, 71, Slovenian Olympic ice hockey player.
William Ungar, 100, Polish-born American Holocaust survivor and memoirist.
John D. Vanderhoof, 91, American politician, Governor of Colorado (1973–1975).
Bob Wallace, 75, New Zealand test driver and automotive engineer.
Hiroshi Yamauchi, 85, Japanese businessman, President of Nintendo (1949–2002, 2002–2005), owner of Seattle Mariners, complications from pneumonia.
Saye Zerbo, 81, Burkinabé politician, President of Upper Volta (1980–1982).

20
 Ercan Aktuna, 73, Turkish footballer (Fenerbahçe).
 D. J. R. Bruckner, 79, American journalist.
 George Bryan, 92, British businessman, founder of Drayton Manor Theme Park.
 Carolyn Cassady, 90, American beat writer.
 Jim Charlton, 102, Canadian coin dealer and numismatic publisher.
 Robert W. Ford, 90, British diplomat and radio operator.
Robert J. Odegard, 92, American businessman and politician.
 Robert L. Reymond, 80, American Christian theologian.
 Ron Richards, 85, Australian football player (Collingwood).
 Angelo Savoldi, 99, American professional wrestler and promoter.
Ernest Schultz, 82, French soccer player.
 James B. Vaught, 86, American army lieutenant general, drowned.
 Gilles Verlant, 56, Belgian journalist and music critic.

21
Ruhila Adatia-Sood, 31, Kenyan radio presenter, shot.
Kofi Awoonor, 78, Ghanaian poet and diplomat, shot.
Michel Brault, 85, Canadian film director.
Justo Galaviz, 59, Venezuelan Olympic cyclist.
Harl H. Haas, Jr., 80, American politician and jurist.
Taro Ishida, 69, Japanese voice actor (Astro Boy, Akira), myocardial infarction.
Walt Linden, 89, American baseball player (Boston Braves).
Chester Moody, 78, American Negro league baseball player.
Francis Peay, 69, American football player (New York Giants, Green Bay Packers, Kansas City Chiefs) and coach (Northwestern University).
Peter Solan, 84, Slovak film director.
René Solís, 88, Cuban baseball player.
Roman Vlad, 93, Romanian-born Italian composer, pianist and musicologist.
Walter Wallmann, 80, German politician. 
Ko Wierenga, 80, Dutch politician, Mayor of Enschede (1977–1994).

22
Gary Brandner, 80, American horror author (The Howling), esophageal cancer.
Jane Connell, 87, American stage, musical theatre and television actress (Mame).
Kenneth Eager, 84, British sculptor.
Manuel González, 84, Spanish footballer.
David H. Hubel, 87, Canadian-born American neurologist, laureate of the Nobel Prize in Physiology or Medicine (1981).
Álvaro Mutis, 90, Colombian poet, novelist and essayist.
John E. Naus, 89, American Jesuit priest.
Dave Nichol, 73, Canadian product marketeer (Loblaw).
Phyllis Pond, 82, American politician, member of the Indiana House of Representatives (since 1978).
Howard Riopelle, 91, Canadian ice hockey player (Montreal Canadiens).
Mohan Singh, 68, Indian politician, member of the Lok Sabha for Deoria (1991–1996; 1998–1999; 2004–2009), cancer.
Hans Erich Slany, 86, German industrial designer, founded TEAMS Design.
Luciano Vincenzoni, 87, Italian screenwriter (For a Few Dollars More, The Good, the Bad and the Ugly), lung cancer.

23
Abdel Hamid al-Sarraj, 87–88, Syrian army officer and politician, Chairman of the Executive Council of the Northern Region of the United Arab Republic (1960–1961).
Severiano Álvarez, 80, Spanish writer.
Eivinn Berg, 82, Norwegian ambassador and politician, traffic collision. 
Acharya Buddharakkhita, 91, Indian Buddhist monk, founded the Maha Bodhi Society.
Denys Chamay, 71, Swiss Olympic fencer.
Gil Dozier, 79, American politician and convicted extortionist, Louisiana Commissioner of Agriculture and Forestry (1976–1980).
Oscar Espinosa Chepe, 72, Cuban economist, liver disease.
Harry Goodwin, 89, British photographer.
Anthony Hawkins, 80, Australian actor (Special Squad). 
John Hipwell, 65, Australian rugby union player and national team captain.
Rex Hobcroft, 88, Australian pianist, conductor, composer and music administrator.
Hannu Kankkonen, 79, Finnish footballer.
Annette Kerr, 93, British actress.
Christopher Koch, 81, Australian novelist (The Year of Living Dangerously), cancer.
Rupert Kratzer, 68, German Olympic cyclist.
Paul Kuhn, 85, German musician.  
Trevor Lummis, 83, British social historian.
Gia Maione, 72, American jazz singer.
Vlatko Marković, 76, Croatian footballer (NK Dinamo Zagreb, Wiener Sport-Club), President of the Croatian Football Federation (1999, 2005, 2006–2012), Alzheimer's disease.
Ruth Patrick, 105, American ecology pioneer.
Hugo Raes, 84, Belgian writer and poet.
Geo Saizescu, 80, Romanian film director, screenwriter and actor.
Kirsten Sørlie, 86, Norwegian actress and stage director.
Robert C. Stebbins, 98, American herpetologist and illustrator.
Stanisław Szozda, 62, Polish Olympic silver-medalist cyclist (1972, 1976).

24
Clive Akerman, 73, English philatelist. 
Sverre Bruland, 90, Norwegian conductor.
Austin Cooper, 84, Canadian criminal lawyer.
Bernard Corboz, 65, Swiss judge, Vice-President of the Federal Supreme Court (2005–2006).
Paul Dietzel, 89, American football player and coach.
Louis Euzet, 90, French parasitologist.
Pietro Farina, 71, Italian Roman Catholic prelate, Bishop of Alife-Caiazzo (1999–2009) and Caserta (since 2009).
Margaret Feilman, 92, Australian town planner and architect.
Boris Karvasarsky, 82, Ukrainian-born Russian psychiatrist.
Anthony Lawrence, 101, British journalist.
Paddy McFlynn, 96, Irish sports administrator.
Sagadat Nurmagambetov, 89, Kazakh politician and Soviet army general, Minister of Defense (1992–1995).
Paul Oliver, 29, American football player (San Diego Chargers), suicide by gunshot.
Viktor Zinger, 71, Russian Olympic ice hockey champion (1968), world champion (1965–1969).
Ian O. Paquit, 21, Philippine Army enlisted soldier, died from wounds from Zamboanga City crisis

25
Aube, 64, Japanese musician. 
Miron Babiak, 81, Polish Antarctic research ship captain.
Elisabeth Borchers, 87, German writer and poet.
Adalbert Brunke, 101, German Evangelical-Lutheran prelate, Bishop of Kap-Orange (1972–1978), pastor to Nelson Mandela.
Choi In-ho, 67, South Korean writer, salivary gland cancer.
Dayjur, 26, American-bred, British-trained Thoroughbred racehorse, euthanized.
Ron Fenton, 72, English football player and coach (Nottingham Forest).
Timothy Joseph Lyne, 94, American Roman Catholic prelate, Auxiliary Bishop of Chicago (1983–1995).
José Montoya, 81, American poet, artist and educator, co-founder of Royal Chicano Air Force, lymphoma.
Billy Mure, 97, American guitarist.
Vladimir Oidupaa, 64, Russian Tuvan musician.
Hans-Joachim Rotzsch, 84, German choral conductor.
Bill Stewart, 85, American baseball player.
Pablo Verani, 75, Italian-born Argentinian politician, Senator (since 2007).
Bennet Wong, 83, Canadian psychiatrist.
George N. Zenovich, 91, American politician and judge, member of the California State Senate (1971–1979).

26
Azizan Abdul Razak, 68, Malaysian politician, Menteri Besar of Kedah (2008–2013), heart attack.
Denis Brodeur, 82, Canadian Olympic bronze-medalist ice hockey player (1956) and photographer.
Don Donovan, 83, Irish football player and manager (Grimsby Town, Everton, Boston United).
Seánie Duggan, 90, Irish hurler (Galway). 
Ellis Evans, 83, Welsh Celtic scholar.
Ronald Gerritse, 61, Dutch civil servant.
Anup Ghatak, 72, Indian cricketer.
Arnstein Johansen, 88, Norwegian accordionist.
Harold E. Kleinert, 91, American surgeon.
Evelyn G. Lowery, 88, American civil rights activist (Selma to Montgomery marches), complications from a stroke.
Robert Martensen, 66, American physician, historian and author.
Mustapha Masmoudi, 75-76, Tunisian politician and diplomat.
Mario Montez, 78, American drag artist and actor.
Takafusa Nakamura, 87, Japanese economist, hepatitis.
Sos Sargsyan, 83, Armenian actor.
Helge Solvang, 100, Norwegian war sailor.

27
Gates Brown, 74, American baseball player (Detroit Tigers).
John Calvert, 102, American magician.
Oscar Castro-Neves, 73, Brazilian bossa nova musician.
Berty Premalal Dissanayake, 59, Sri Lankan politician, Chief Minister of the North Central Province (1999–2012). 
Mauricio González-Gordon y Diez, 89, Spanish conservationist and sherry trader.
Ernst Gutting, 94, German Roman Catholic prelate, Auxiliary Bishop of Speyer (1971–1994).
Elvin R. Heiberg III, 81, American army general, Chief of Engineers (1984–1988). 
Jock Kane, 92, British intelligence officer.
Ferenc Kárpáti, 86, Hungarian military officer and politician, Minister of Defence (1985–1990).
Birger Kivelä, 92, Finnish Olympic diver (1952).
Tuncel Kurtiz, 77, Turkish actor, fall.
A. C. Lyles, 95, American producer (Deadwood, Rawhide). 
Silvano Montevecchi, 75, Italian Roman Catholic prelate, Bishop of Ascoli Piceno (since 1997).
Albert Naughton, 84, English rugby league player (Widnes, Warrington).
Jay Robinson, 83, American actor (Dracula, Star Trek, The Waltons, The Robe).
Aluthwewa Soratha Thera, 70, Sri Lankan monk.

28
Carlo Castellaneta, 83, Italian author and journalist, pneumonia.
James Emanuel, 92, American poet and academic.
Faz Fazakas, 95, American puppeteer, engineer, and special effects designer.
Jonathan Fellows-Smith, 81, South African cricketer.
Farouk Janeman, 60, Fijian football player and manager (Ba).
T.M. Kamble, 67, Indian politician, leader of Republican Party of India (Democratic), heart attack.
Sandro Mariátegui Chiappe, 91, Peruvian politician, Prime Minister (1984), Senator (1980–1992), heart failure.
Odlanier Mena, 87, Chilean army general and intelligence chief, suicide.
Turgut Özakman, 83, Turkish author.
Anatoli Parov, 57, Russian footballer.
Igor Romishevsky, 73, Russian Olympic ice hockey champion (1968, 1972), world champion (1968–1971).
Ted Rusoff, 74, Canadian-born Italian actor (The Passion of the Christ, The Last Temptation of Christ, The Nativity Story), injuries sustained in a traffic collision.
Walter Schmidinger, 80, Austrian actor.
Michael Sullivan, 96, English art historian.
Remo Tomasi, 81, Italian Olympic speed skater.
B. B. Watson, 60, American country music singer.
George Amon Webster, 67, American Southern gospel singer, cancer.

29
Harold Agnew, 92, American physicist, leukemia.
Anton Benning, 95, German World War II Luftwaffe ace.
Patricia Castell, 87, Argentinian actress, pneumonia.
Pete Cenarrusa, 95, American politician, Secretary of State of Idaho (1967–2003), lung cancer.
Carl Joachim Classen, 85, German classical scholar. 
S. N. Goenka, 89, Burmese-born Indian Vipassana teacher.
Lawrence Goodwyn, 85, American writer and political theorist.
L. C. Greenwood, 67, American football player (Pittsburgh Steelers), kidney failure.
Marcella Hazan, 89, Italian-born American cookbook author.
Yury Isakov, 63, Soviet Olympic athlete.
Pete Kettela, 75, American football executive and coach (Edmonton Eskimos).
Bob Kurland, 88, American basketball player (Oklahoma A&M Aggies), Olympic champion (1948, 1952).
Robert Leeson, 85, English children's writer.
Michael Maher, 77, Australian politician, MP for Lowe (1982–1987).
Charles McKean, 67, Scottish architectural historian. 
Roy Peterson, 77, Canadian editorial cartoonist.
Gene Petit, 63, American professional wrestler (WWF).
Hugh de Wardener, 97, British medical doctor.
Scott Workman, 47, American stuntman (Crank, Iron Man 2, End of Days), cancer.
Toyoko Yamasaki, 88, Japanese writer, heart failure.

30
Kazys Bobelis, 90, Lithuanian politician, MP for Marijampolė (1992–2006).
John Flanagan, 71, Scottish footballer (Partick Thistle).
David Gitari, 76, Kenyan primate and Archbishop of the Anglican Church of Kenya (1997–2002).
Anthony Hinds, 91, British screenwriter and producer.
Kinmont Hoitsma, 79, American Olympic fencer.
John Hopkins, 86, British-born Australian conductor and music administrator.
Ruth Maleczech, 74, American actress (Nick and Norah's Infinite Playlist, The Crucible), cancer.
Evelyn M. Nowak, 100, American politician.
Janet Powell, 71, Australian politician, Leader of the Australian Democrats (1990–1991), Senator for Victoria (1986–1993), pancreatic cancer.
Ramblin' Tommy Scott, 96, American country and rockabilly musician, complications from traffic collision.
Olive Stevenson, 82, British academic and social worker.
James Street, 65, American football player (University of Texas), heart attack.
Rangel Valchanov, 84, Bulgarian actor and film director, cancer.
Zulema, 66, American R&B singer (Faith Hope and Charity).

References

2013-09
 09